Ebaeides montana is a species of longhorn beetle in the tribe Apomecynini. It was described by Fisher in 1925.

References

Ebaeides
Beetles described in 1925